The ARIA Music Award for Best Urban Album, was an award presented at the annual ARIA Music Awards, which recognises "the many achievements of Aussie artists across all music genres", since 1987. It was handed out by the Australian Recording Industry Association (ARIA), an organisation whose aim is "to advance the interests of the Australian record industry." Best Urban Album was first presented as Best Urban Release in 2004, for an album or single released by a solo artist or group until 2010, where it changed to Best Urban Album.

To be eligible, the work must have been within the RnB, hip-hop, soul, funk, reggae and dancehall genres. In the case of a remixed or re-worked album, it was eligible provided that: it was not a final five nominee in any other category; contain 50% new lyrical and musical content; the artist(s) and production team meet the artist eligibility criteria; and the ARIA member entering the album must choose the artist or production team as the recipient of the award. The nominated album must qualify for inclusion in the ARIA Album Chart, and cannot be entered in any other genre categories. The accolade was voted for by a judging school, which comprises between 40 and 100 members of representatives experienced in this genre, and is given to an artist who is either from Australia or an Australian resident.

The award for Best Urban Album was first presented as Best Urban Release to Koolism in 2004, for his album Part 3 - Random Thoughts. Hilltop Hoods have received six wins from six nominations, more than any other artist, for The Hard Road in 2006, The Hard Road: Restrung in 2007, State of the Art in 2009, Drinking from the Sun in 2012 and Walking Under Stars in 2014. It was last presented in 2018, as Best Urban Release, to Hilltop Hoods featuring Adrian Eagle for "Clark Griswold". It was replaced by two categories, Best Hip Hop Release and Best Soul/R&B Release in 2019.

Winners and nominees
In the following table, the winner is highlighted in a separate colour, and in boldface; the nominees are those that are not highlighted or in boldface.

Best Urban Release (2004–2009)

Best Urban Album (2010–2017)

Best Urban Release (2018)

References

External links
The ARIA Awards Official website

U
Hip hop awards